Cristian Guanca (born 26 March 1993) is an Argentinian professional footballer who plays as a left midfielder and a forward for Al-Shabab.

Career
On 17 June 2018, Guanca joined Saudi Arabian club Al-Ettifaq on a one-year loan from Colón.

On 3 July 2019, Guanca joined Al-Shabab on a three-year contract. On 9 July 2021, Guanca signed one-year contract extension before joining Emirati side Al Ain on loan. On 24 August 2022, Guanca renewed his contract with Al-Shabab, signing a three-year extension.

Career statistics

Club

References

External links 
 
 Cristian Guanca
Cristian Guanca

Living people
Argentine footballers
Argentine expatriate footballers
Footballers from Buenos Aires
1993 births
Chacarita Juniors footballers
Club Atlético Colón footballers
C.S. Emelec footballers
Kasımpaşa S.K. footballers
Ettifaq FC players
Al-Shabab FC (Riyadh) players
Al Ain FC players
Argentine Primera División players
Primera Nacional players
Ecuadorian Serie A players
Süper Lig players
Saudi Professional League players
UAE Pro League players
Argentine emigrants to Ecuador
Argentine expatriate sportspeople in Ecuador
Expatriate footballers in Turkey
Argentine expatriate sportspeople in Turkey
Expatriate footballers in Saudi Arabia
Argentine expatriate sportspeople in Saudi Arabia
Expatriate footballers in the United Arab Emirates
Argentine expatriate sportspeople in the United Arab Emirates
Association football midfielders